The Indonesian Inter Island Cup (IIC) was a national level football tournament held in Indonesia and organized by PSSI as a pre-season tournament during the Indonesia Super League season break. The tournament involved best clubs representing 5 large islands in Indonesia: Sumatra, Java, Kalimantan, Sulawesi and Papua.

The first edition was originally scheduled in 2009 but was cancelled due to many reasons.

The second edition of the tournament was held in August - September 2010. Malang, the home city of Arema Malang (2009–10 ISL champion) and Palembang, the home base of Sriwijaya FC (2010 Piala Indonesia champion) hosted the event.

Format
The 2010 Inter Island Cup was held with a half-competition system, where the 6 participating teams were divided into 2 groups. In 2011, PT Liga Profesional 4 groups of 12 clubs and each game, matches are played for 3 x 45 minutes, and each match must produce a winner (no draw).

Result

Indonesian Inter Island Cup records

By Club
The following table lists clubs by number of winners and runners-up in Indonesian Inter Island Cup.

By Island
The following table lists islands by number of winners and runners-up in Indonesian Inter Island Cup.

Broadcasters

References

Indonesian Inter Island Cup
Football cup competitions in Indonesia